Handiaya is a town and a nagar panchayat in Barnala district in the Indian state of Punjab.

Demographics
Handiaya is a Nagar Panchayat and a town in district of Barnala, Punjab. The town is divided into 11 wards for which elections are held every 5 years. The Handiaya Nagar Panchayat has population of 12,507 of which 6,810 are males while 5,697 are females as per report released by Census India 2011.

Population of Children with age of 0-6 is 1670 which is 13.35 % of total population of Handiaya (NP). In Handiaya Nagar Panchayat, Female Sex Ratio is of 837 against state average of 895. Moreover Child Sex Ratio in Handiaya is around 843 compared to Punjab state average of 846. Literacy rate of Handiaya city is 66.26 % lower than state average of 75.84 %. In Handiaya, Male literacy is around 71.29 % while female literacy rate is 60.25 %.Handiaya Nagar Panchayat has total administration over 2,702 houses to which it supplies basic amenities like water and sewerage. It is also authorize to build roads within Nagar Panchayat limits and impose taxes on properties coming under its jurisdiction.

Famous for
HG Eaton Plaza

References

Handiaya is historical town in Barnala district, there is a floating stone in Nath Wala Dera, That is floating in water.

Cities and towns in Barnala district